Indraneel Bhattacharya (born 14 October 1970) is an Indian film and television actor. He has received his bachelor’s from St. Xavier’s College, Mumbai in B.A. economics and Political Science. Indraneel began his career as a background artist in films. He is married to actress Anjali Mukhi.

Career 
His first notable performance was seen in the Sanjay Leela Bansali directed film Hum Dil De Chuke Sanam. The actor later went on to play several roles in Bollywood films including movies like Rustom, Taamasha, Golmaal Again, Jai Gangaajal. Indraneel was also worked in various Hindi TV serials like Gustalk Dil, Ye Pyar Na Hoga Kam, Meher, Kumkum- Ek Pyara Sa Bandhan, Khwaish, I Luv My India.

Filmography

Films

Television

Web series

Awards 
 Nominated for Zee Rishtey Award for Favourite Mata-Pita.

References

External links
 

Male actors from Mumbai
Living people
1970 births
Male actors in Hindi cinema
Male actors in Hindi television
21st-century Indian male actors